Horace Tabberer Brown FRS (20 July 1848 – 6 February 1925) was a British chemist.

Early life
He was born after the death of his biological father so his stepfather was the only father he knew. The stepfather was a banker and amateur naturalist which led to Brown's interest in science, which began around age 12. His younger half brother was Adrian John Brown.

Career
He started work at the Worthington Brewery in 1866. His focus was to solve practical brewing problems by employing and developing fundamental scientific principles. His research work considered barley germination, beer microbiology, water composition, oxygen and fermentation, beer haze formation, wort composition and beer analysis.

A true polymath, he left his mark on virtually all areas of science as applied to brewing, in a career which lasted over 50 years. His earliest work concerned treatment of sewage and analyses of the Burton waters. Later he took up study of geology, being led to it by pressing requirements in connection with the water supply of Burton. This entailed a good deal of field surveying, which was embodied in a paper on the Permian Rocks of the Leicestershire Coalfield.

He was elected a Fellow of the Royal Society in 1889. From 1890 onward studied the assimilation of Carbon dioxide in plants. He also established the Guinness Research Laboratory in Dublin in 1901.

Awards
He was awarded the Longstaff Medal of the Chemical Society in 1894, a Royal Medal of the Royal Society in 1903 and the Copley Medal in 1920.

The Horace Brown Medal

The Institute of Brewing and Distilling awards the Horace Brown Medal to eminent scientist every three years. The winner is invited to give a lecture, called the Horace Brown Medal lecture.

Winners include:
 Henry Edward Armstrong (the first recipient in 1926)
 Ernest Stanley Salmon (1955)
 John Simpson Ford
 D E Briggs (1999)
 Lionel D Maule (2005)
 Graham Stewart (2008)
 Tim Dolan (2011)
 Charlie Bamforth (2018)

References

External links
 Obituary note (pdf)
 Obituary from Biochemical Journal
 Horace Brown: Reminiscences of Fifty Years’ Experience of the Application of Scientific Method to Brewing Practice

1848 births
1925 deaths
Fellows of the Royal Society
Recipients of the Copley Medal
Royal Medal winners
Brewery workers
Burials at Nunhead Cemetery
Place of birth missing